This is a list of Portuguese football transfers for the 2010 summer transfer window. The summer transfer window opened on 1 July and closed at midnight on 1 September. Only moves involving Portuguese Liga and Liga de Honra clubs are listed. Players without a club may join one at any time, either during or in between transfer windows.

Transfers

 Player who signs with club before 1 July officially joins his new club on 1 July 2010, while player who joined after 1 July joined his new club following his signature of the contract.

Notes and references

Portugal
2010–11 in Portuguese football
Lists of Portuguese football transfers